Dakota is a unisex given name derived from the name of the indigenous Native American Dakota people, or from the name of two states in the United States, North Dakota and South Dakota, which are also derived from the Dakota people local to that area. The name is translated to mean "friend", "friendly" or "allies" in the Yankton-Yanktonai and Santee dialects of the Dakota language.

Popularity
The name has been in occasional use for both sexes in the United States since at least the 1940s and is currently used in roughly equal numbers for both boys and girls in that country. 
The name's popularity grew in the 1990s in the United States. It was among the top 100 most popular boy names from 1993 to 2001, reaching its peak at number 56 in 1995. Since 2010, it has been slightly more frequently given to girls. As of 2021, it was the 270th most common girl name and the 344th most common boy name.

People with the name
 Dakota Abberton, Australian surfer
 Dakota Allen (born 1995), American football player
 Dakota Darsow (born 1987), American professional wrestler
 Dakota Daulby (born 1994), Canadian actor
 Dakota Fanning (born 1994), American actress
 Dakota Floeter (born 1994), American actor and musician
 Dakota Goyo (born 1999), Canadian actor
 Dakota Johnson (born 1989), American model and actress
 Dakota Kai (born 1988), New Zealander professional wrestler
 Dakota Lane (born 1959), American author
 Dakota Meyer, United States Marine and Medal of Honor recipient
 Dakota Morton (born 1988), Canadian radio host
 Dakota North (speedway rider) (born 1991), Australian speedway rider
 Dakota Rose (born 1995), Japan-based American model
 Dakota Blue Richards (born 1994), English actress
 Dakota Staton (1930–2007), American jazz singer
 Rayne Dakota (Dak) Prescott (born 1993), American football quarterback for the Dallas Cowboys

Fictional
 Dakota North (comics), a fictional Marvel Comics character
 Dakota Milton, a character in Total Drama: Revenge of the Island, the fourth season of the Total Drama series
Dakota, a police officer in Lond Wolf Macqaude, portrayed by L.Q. Jones

Notes

English-language unisex given names
Feminine given names
Masculine given names
Unisex given names
English unisex given names